Four Knights may refer to:

Four Knights Game, a chess opening
The Four Knights, an American doo wop group
Four Nights in Knaresborough, a play by Paul Corcoran (Paul Webb) 
The working title for the 1971 song, "Early 1970" by Ringo Starr
The Four Horsemen of the Apocalypse
The current 4 autonomous okrugs of Russia:
Chukotka Autonomous Okrug
Khanty-Mansi Autonomous Okrug
Nenets Autonomous Okrug
Yamalo-Nenets Autonomous Okrug
The countries of the United Kingdom:
England
Scotland
Wales
Northern Ireland
The provinces of Ireland:
Leinster
Connacht
Munster
Ulster
The Turkic-speaking states of Central Asia:
Kazakhstan
Kyrgyzstan
Turkmenistan
Uzbekistan